The Third Battle of Artois (25 September – 4 November 1915, also the Loos–Artois Offensive), was fought by the French Tenth Army against the German 6th Army on the Western Front of the First World War. The battle included the Battle of Loos by the British First Army. The offensive, meant to complement the Second Battle of Champagne, was the last attempt that year by Joseph Joffre, the French commander-in-chief, to exploit an Allied numerical advantage over Germany. Simultaneous attacks were planned in Champagne-Ardenne to capture the railway at Attigny and in Artois to take the railway line through Douai, to force a German withdrawal from the Noyon salient.

Background
Joffre's plan was a series of attacks along the Western Front, supported by Italian attacks across the Isonzo River and a British Expeditionary Force (BEF) attack near Loos-en-Gohelle. At first, Field Marshal John French and General Sir Douglas Haig opposed the attack, because of the lay of the land, a lack of heavy artillery, ammunition and reserves. The generals were over-ruled by the British minister of war, Lord Kitchener, who ordered French and Haig to conduct the offensive.

Prelude

The Tenth Army massed seventeen infantry and two cavalry divisions for the offensive, backed by  guns and  artillery pieces. The 6th Army had about thirteen divisions and from  the French field artillery fired  rounds of ammunition and the heavy artillery  at the German defences. Obsolete 90 mm guns were used to fire another

Battle

XXI Corps attacked the rest of Souchez village and La Folie farm, XXXIII Corps made some progress but the III and XII corps to the south was repulsed. During the afternoon it began to rain, impeding artillery observation and attack times were altered to even later in the day, which made co-ordination with the British First Army on the northern flank much more difficult. By 26 September, the XXXIII and XXI corps had taken Souchez but the III and XII corps had made little progress south-east of Neuville-St Vaast.

The French failed to breach the German second line of defence and a breakthrough could not be achieved. Joffre sent the French IX Corps to assist the British attacks at Loos but this action also yielded little of strategic value. Foch was also ordered by Joffre to conserve infantry and ammunition to reinforce the simultaneous offensive in Champagne; ammunition expenditure in Artois had been so vast that the offensive was to be reduced but without giving the British the impression that they were being left in the lurch. In very wet weather, the Tenth Army captured Vimy Ridge, except for the highest point, where German counter-attacks retook the ground from XXXIII Corps. Foch took over ground on the British right flank but it became impossible to co-ordinate attacks for the same day. The Battle continued until 13 October but ended amidst the autumn rains, mutual exhaustion and inter-Allied recriminations.

Aftermath

Analysis

After advancing  in their previous offensive in May, the French advanced an additional  by the end of their September offensive. Fayolle reported that the Third Battle of Artois had been a failure, because of uncut wire and the firepower of German machine-guns and artillery. The success of infantry attacks was dependent on the ability of the artillery to cut the wire, destroy German field fortifications and prevent the German artillery bombarding French infantry by using counter-battery fire; the simultaneous Second Battle of Champagne continued into October.

Casualties

The official historians of the  recorded  casualties to the end of October. In 2008, Jack Sheldon used figures taken from the French Official History to record  fewer than half of the French casualties suffered in the spring offensive from April to June. James Edmonds, the British official historian, recorded  and  casualties at the Battle of Loos.

Notes

Footnotes

References

External links

 Chtimiste.com: Third Battle of Artois (French)

Battles of the Western Front (World War I)
Conflicts in 1915
History of the Pas-de-Calais
Battles of World War I involving France
Battles of World War I involving Germany
Artois 1
Battles of World War I involving British India
1915 in France
September 1915 events
October 1915 events
November 1915 events